Trial & Error Records is an independent record label based in Melbourne, Victoria. It is one of Australia's largest hardcore labels. The label is owned and run by Mindsnare bassist, Nigel Melder. As of 2019 Trial and Error are no longer releasing music.

Current artists
4dead
Against
Antagonist A.D
Bulldog Spirit
Dead Kings
Dropsaw
Extortion
From The Ruins
Fuck It I Quit
Hopeless
In Name and Blood
Jungle Fever
Life In Pictures
Lookin' In
Mary Jane Kelly
Meatlocker
Mindsnare
S W \V Z D (Sex Wizard)
The Nation Blue
Pet Meat
Samsara
The Seduction
Tenth Dan
Stretch Arm Strong

Former bands

Charter 77
Toe To Toe
Through His Blood
Ultimatum
 Day of Contempt
 Shotpointblank
 Embodiment 12:14

See also
 List of record labels
 Australian hardcore

External links
Official Website
Official MySpace

Australian independent record labels
Record labels established in 1997
Hardcore record labels
Punk record labels